François Peraldi (May 2, 1938 – March 21, 1993) was a Canadian psychoanalyst and linguist. Peraldi introduced Jacques Lacan's clinical work into North America. He rejected the label Lacanian for himself and preferred to say he was engaged in "Lacanizing." Peraldi established a biweekly Peraldi Seminar for 15 years and established the Réseau des Cartels to help disseminate Lacan's and his group's ideas. He died of AIDS in 1993.

Life and career

Peraldi was studying medicine when he underwent a teaching psychoanalysis at the Paris Psychoanalytic Society. He then completed his training at École Freudienne de Paris. He began working as an institutional psychotherapist with young psychotics. Along with his psychoanalytic training, he completed a doctorate in linguistics with Roland Barthes at the Centre National de la Recherche Scientifique.

In 1974 he emigrated to Montreal with an appointment in the Department of Linguistics of the University of Montreal. His Peraldi seminar, held every other Wednesday from 1976 to 1991 helped create a community of like-minded practitioners. In 1986 Peraldi established the Réseau des Cartels, designed as a way to pass on the learnings of himself and his cohorts without creating an institutionalized system.

He edited the Polysexuality edition of the journal Semiotext(e), which outlines his personal approach to sexuality.

Selected works
Peraldi, François (1970). The Erotic Body of Language. Texte
Duncan, C; Peraldi, François (1974). Discourse of the Erotic: The Erotic in the Discourse. Meanjin Quarterly
Peraldi, François (1978). Pour traduire "Un coup de dés..." Meta: Journal des traducteurs
Peraldi, François (1978). L'élangage de la Folie. Santé mentale au Québec
Peraldi, François (1980). Au-delà de la sémiolinguistique. La sémiotique de CS Peirce. Langages Paris
Eco, Umberto; Peraldi, François (1980). Peirce et la sémantique contemporaine. Langages
Peraldi, François (1981). La psychanalyse se meurt, la psychanalyse est morte, vive la GRC psychiatrique! Santé mentale au Québec
Peraldi, François (1981). Why did Peirce terrorize Benveniste? Semiotica
Peraldi, François (1982). Psychanalyse et traduction. Meta: Journal des traducteurs
Peraldi, François (1984). Elle, l'Autre. Études freudiennes
Peraldi, François (1987). The thing for Freud and the Freudian thing. 'American Journal of Psychoanalysis
Peraldi, François (1988). A Note on Time in The Purloined Letter
Peraldi, François, Egyed Bela [trans.] (1989). Passing-A-Way-Of-The-Child. in Nietzsche and the Rhetoric of Nihilism: Essays on Interpretation, Language and Politics
Peraldi, François (1990). Théoriser, c'est pas terroriser ou l'erreur en traduction. Meta: Journal des traducteurs
Peraldi, François (1990). The Passion of Death. A Free Associative Reading of Freud and Marguerite Duras. L'esprit Createur
Peraldi, François (1991). The "Great Man" from Vienna to Paris in the Thirties. American Imago
Peraldi, François (1992). Heterosexual Presumption. American Imago

References

1938 births
1993 deaths
Canadian psychoanalysts